Escape from Sahara (German: Madeleine und der Legionär) is a 1958 West German adventure drama film directed by Wolfgang Staudte and starring Hildegard Knef, Bernhard Wicki and  Hannes Messemer. It was shot at the Tempelhof Studios in Berlin with location shooting taking place in Cuxhaven and in Tangier in North Africa. The film's sets were designed by the art directors Andrej Andrejew, Fritz Lippmann and Helmut Nentwig. It was part of an upsurge of popular interest in West Germany about France's War in Algeria, particularly Germans serving there.

Synopsis
A French teacher assists a German serving in the French Foreign Legion who has deserted.

Cast
 Hildegard Knef as Madeleine Durand
 Bernhard Wicki as Luigi Locatelli
 Hannes Messemer as 	Robert Altmann
 Helmut Schmid as Kilby, Pat
 Joachim Hansen as Kurt Gerber
 Harry Meyen as Jean de Maire
 Leonard Steckel as 	Ben Achmed
 Werner Peters as 	Brouillard
 Siegfried Lowitz as 	Kapitän Gerlach
 Hanita Hallan as Miss. Price
 Manfred Heidmann as Perrier
 Friedrich Gnaß as 	Germanini
 Ursula Diestel as 	Lucienne Germanini

References

Bibliography
 Biess, Frank. German Angst: Fear and Democracy in the Federal Republic of Germany. Oxford University Press, 2020.
 Broadbent, Philip & Hake, Sabine. Berlin Divided City, 1945-1989. Berghahn Books, 2010.

External links

1958 films
1950s adventure films
German adventure films
1954 drama films
1950s German-language films
German drama films
West German films
Films directed by Wolfgang Staudte
1950s German films
Films shot at Tempelhof Studios
Films about the French Foreign Legion
UFA GmbH films
Films shot in Morocco